The second season of the HBO television series Boardwalk Empire premiered on September 25, 2011, and concluded on December 11, 2011, consisting of 12 episodes.  The series was created by Terence Winter and based on the book Boardwalk Empire: The Birth, High Times and Corruption of Atlantic City by Nelson Johnson. Set in Atlantic City, New Jersey, during the Prohibition era, the series stars Steve Buscemi as Enoch "Nucky" Thompson (based on the historical Enoch L. Johnson), a political figure who rose to prominence and controlled Atlantic City, New Jersey, during the Prohibition period of the 1920s and 1930s. The second season takes place between February and August 1921. The second season was released on DVD and Blu-ray in region 1 on August 28, 2012.

Cast

Main
Jack Huston and Gretchen Mol were promoted to series regulars for the second season after appearing in several episodes during the first season.
Steve Buscemi as Enoch "Nucky" Thompson
Michael Pitt as James "Jimmy" Darmody
Kelly Macdonald as Margaret Schroeder
Michael Shannon as Nelson Van Alden
Shea Whigham as Elias "Eli" Thompson
Aleksa Palladino as Angela Darmody
Michael Stuhlbarg as Arnold Rothstein
Stephen Graham as Al Capone
Vincent Piazza as Charlie Luciano
Paz de la Huerta as Lucy Danziger
Michael Kenneth Williams as Albert "Chalky" White
Anthony Laciura as Eddie Kessler
Paul Sparks as Mieczyslaw "Mickey Doyle" Kozik
Jack Huston as Richard Harrow
Gretchen Mol as Gillian Darmody
Dabney Coleman as Commodore Louis Kaestner

Recurring

Episodes

Reception

Critical reception
The second season of Boardwalk Empire received extremely positive reviews from critics. On the review aggregator website Metacritic, the second season scored 81/100 based on 14 reviews.  Another aggregator website, Rotten Tomatoes, reported 85% of critics gave the second season a "Certified Fresh" rating, based on 13 reviews with an average score of 8/10, with the site consensus stating "Boardwalk Empire delves deeper into both its intriguing supporting players and its rich tapestry of moral ambiguity."

Awards and nominations
The second season received 12 Primetime Emmy Award nominations for the 64th Primetime Emmy Awards and won 4 altogether. The series received its second consecutive nomination for Outstanding Drama Series, while Steve Buscemi was nominated for Outstanding Lead Actor in a Drama Series. The series won the Primetime Emmy Award for Outstanding Art Direction for a Single-Camera Series, Outstanding Cinematography for a Single-Camera Series for "21", and Outstanding Special Visual Effects Television Miniseries, Movie, or Special for "Georgia Peaches" at the 64th Primetime Creative Arts Emmy Awards. Tim Van Patten won the Primetime Emmy Award for Outstanding Directing for a Drama Series for "To the Lost".

References

External links 
 
 

Boardwalk Empire
2011 American television seasons
Fiction set in 1921

fr:Boardwalk Empire#Deuxième saison (2011)